José Antonio Castillo Barragán (born 17 February 1970 in Granada, Andalusia) is a Spanish retired footballer who played as a midfielder.

External links
 
 

1970 births
Living people
Footballers from Granada
Spanish footballers
Association football midfielders
La Liga players
Segunda División players
Segunda División B players
Tercera División players
CD Málaga footballers
Real Valladolid players
UD Almería players
CA Marbella footballers
Motril CF players
Primeira Liga players
G.D. Chaves players
Spain under-23 international footballers
Spanish expatriate footballers
Expatriate footballers in Portugal